"Shark in the Water" is a song recorded by English singer-songwriter V V Brown for her debut studio album Travelling Like the Light. It was released on 6 July 2009 by Island Records as the album's third single. The song is a metaphorical record about anxiety, and was inspired by Brown's experience with infidelity by a past boyfriend who liked to stalk her in his free time. The song is her first single to get high airplay on U.S. music channels and radio (neither "Leave!" nor "Crying Blood" were able to achieve this). The song was also re-recorded in the Simlish language of The Sims and is featured in The Sims 3: Ambitions. The song is her first single to chart in the U.S. on Billboard Hot 100 peaking at number sixty-seven. The song was certified Gold in the US.

Music video
The video is about Brown finding out that her boyfriend is cheating on her, so she follows him around taking pictures of him with the other girl. At the beginning of the video she starts to record the song on a radio. The video switches between Brown walking by the side of a canal, and under a bridge, to seeing her at a pub table looking at the pictures of her cheating boyfriend. It finishes with a view of her boyfriend's house with a picture on his door and the radio that Brown used to record the song on the doorstep.

A second version of the music video was shot to promote the U.S. release of the album which features Brown performing at a carnival. The video also features the cast of the hit Canadian series Degrassi. The cast of Degrassi portray various carnival-goers and performers each in a different scenario that represents a storyline from the show's 10th season. VV Brown witnesses these scenes from backstage before she's shown going on stage and performing for a crowd.

Critical reception
Popjustice gave the song a positive review, writing "Immediately brilliant - a reinterpretation rather than a continuation of the 'indie doo wop' schtick she's been working on over the last couple of singles and therefore a lot less stylised and a great deal more accessible." Nick Levine of Digital Spy gave the song 5 out of 5, stating "It begins in bright, breezy fashion, all-girl group backing vocals and guitar-strumming that brings to mind Craig McLachlan's 'Mona', before something a bit magical happens - the arrival of a pure pop chorus as huge and all-consuming as a T.rex that's just come off hunger strike. Crossover radio smash? Here's hoping - but it's hard to see how she could do any more. The song also received a positive review from Female First. In a five-star rating, the song was described as "happy-go-lucky song... but it’s when the powerful, heartfelt chorus kicks in that you really take a breath and think, 'Shit, this song is awesome.' So, it seems the claims that what the press have been saying about this lady finally has some truth in it at last; she really is one of the ladies to watch out for in 2009."

Music OMH writes: "'Shark in the Water' could easily be described as a 'summer anthem', all breezy acoustic strums, insanely catchy melodies and a chorus that explodes seemingly from nowhere. It also features that key ingredient to all great pop songs; a nonsense lyric. 'Baby there's a shark in the water, I caught them barking at the moon' is a wonderfully mixed image, the kind of animal creation a cartoonist would balk at for being too ridiculous."

Track listings and formats

CD Single + Digital Download
"Shark in the Water" – 3:04

Amazon MP3
"Shark in the Water" – 3:06
"Shark in the Water" (Wendel Kos Sunlight Remix) – 7:18
"Shark in the Water" (Wendel Kos Dub Remix) – 6:44
"Shark in the Water" (Louis La Roche Remix Edit) – 2:49
"Shark in the Water" (Louis La Roche Dub Remix) – 3:19

iTunes EP
"Shark in the Water" – 3:06
"Shark in the Water" (Blame Remix) – 6:01
"Shark in the Water" (Wendel Kos Sunlight Remix) – 7:18
"Shark in the Water" (Wendel Kos Dub Remix) – 6:44
"Shark in the Water" (Louis La Roche Remix Edit) – 2:49
"Shark in the Water" (Louis La Roche Dub Remix) – 3:19
Samson & Delilah (Deluxe Edition)
"Shark in the Water" (Alternate Version) – 4:57

Charts

Release history

In popular culture
In 2009, the song was featured in the Ugly Betty episode, "The Bahamas Triangle". 
In the summer of 2010, a Degrassi promo aired in both Canada and the United States, for season 10, and was featured in the mid-season finale, All Falls Down (Part Two).
In 2010, the song appeared in the season seven episode of House, "Small Sacrifices".

References

2009 singles
V V Brown songs
Songs written by Tommy Tysper
Songs written by V V Brown
2009 songs
Island Records singles
Songs written by Marcus Sepehrmanesh